The Battle of Schöngrabern, also known as the Battle of Hollabrunn, was an engagement in the Napoleonic Wars during the War of the Third Coalition, fought on 16 November 1805 near Hollabrunn in Lower Austria, four weeks after the Battle of Ulm and two weeks before the Battle of Austerlitz (Slavkov, Moravia - now Czech Republic).

Battle
The Russian army of Kutuzov was retiring north of the Danube before the French army of Napoleon.  On 13 November 1805 Marshals Murat and Lannes, commanding the French advance guard, had captured a bridge over the Danube at Vienna by falsely claiming that an armistice had been signed, and then rushing the bridge while the guards were distracted. Kutuzov needed to gain time in order to make contact near Brno (Brünn) with reinforcements led by Buxhowden. He ordered his rearguard under Major-General Prince Pyotr Bagration to delay the French.

Murat and Lannes commanded the 4th and 5th Corps and the Reserve Cavalry. Bagration took up a position about 6 km north of Hollabrunn, on the hill above the small town of Schöngrabern (today part of Grabern). Murat believed that the whole of the Russian army was before him, and hesitated to attack.  Bagration then suggested to Murat that negotiations for an armistice should be opened. Murat agreed, and did not attack. When Napoleon was informed of this he was furious and wrote to Murat:

On 16 November 1805 Murat informed Bagration that the armistice would end at 5:00 pm.  The confused action took place during the night. After sustaining several French assaults and holding the position for some six hours, Bagration was driven out and executed a skilled and organised withdrawal to retire northeast to join the main Russian army. His skillful defence in the face of superior forces successfully delayed the French enough for the Russian forces of Kutuzov and Buxhowden to unite at Brno (Brünn) on 18 November 1805.

In popular culture
The battle is depicted in Leo Tolstoy’s novel War and Peace. Prince Andrei Bolkonsky is present and attaches himself to the artillery battery of Captain Tushin. As the battle progresses the battery ends up alone and unsupported, becoming the deciding factor in the successful withdrawal of the Russian troops. Later that evening, some Russian staff officers accuse Captain Tushin of having abandoned his artillery pieces, rather than retreating with the guns as ordered.  Prince Andrei tells Bagration that there were no supporting Russian troops, and that Captain Tushin and his men might well have been the vital point in delaying the French advance.

Given the lack of detail in historical sources for this battle, it is unclear how closely Tolstoy's version of the battle relates to the historical action.

Notes

References

External links 
Russian Hussar Charge at the Battle of Schöngrabern in 1805 (War & Peace, 2016), at Youtube
Napoleon Series
Napoleon Miniatures Wargame Society of Toronto
Order of Battle

Conflicts in 1805
Battles of the Napoleonic Wars
Battles involving Austria
Battles involving Russia
1805 in the Austrian Empire
1805 in France
War of the Third Coalition
Battles of the War of the Third Coalition
November 1805 events
Battles inscribed on the Arc de Triomphe
Joachim Murat